Glaphyrometopus is a genus of broad-nosed weevils in the beetle family Curculionidae. There is at least one described species in Glaphyrometopus, G. ornithodorus.

References

Further reading

 
 
 
 

Weevils
Articles created by Qbugbot